Maylandia hajomaylandi is a species of cichlid endemic to Lake Malawi where it is only known from around Chisumulu Island.  This species can reach a length of  TL.  It can also be found in the aquarium trade. The specific name honours the cichlid enthusiast and author about aquaria Hans Joachim Mayland, who died in 2004,

References

hajomaylandi
Fish of Lake Malawi
Fish of Malawi
Fish described in 1984
Taxobox binomials not recognized by IUCN
Taxonomy articles created by Polbot